The Play Don't Care Who Makes It is the fourth extended play (EP) by American rapper 2 Chainz. It was released on February 8, 2018, by Def Jam Recordings. It features guest appearances from YG and Offset. It was also produced by T-Minus, June James, Nonstop Da Hitman, and Streetrunner, among others.

Background
On February 6, 2018, 2 Chainz teased on social media that new music was on its way. Two days later, 2 Chainz revealed the EP's title, tracklist and release date, which was then released on the same day.

Critical reception

Briana Younger of Pitchfork stated: "On his reflective four-song EP, the Atlanta rapper’s hallmark frivolity and infinite swag keep it short and sweet."

Trent Clark of HipHopDX stated: "TPDCWMI doesn't manifest any all-time 2 Chainz greatest material nor will it cause any shakeups in the current industry." Praising the artist by stating "Such a ruminative number really sheds light on 2 Chainz's OG status, as well as his versatility as an artist, which often gets overlooked being that he’s so adept in Pyrex poetry."

Track listing
Credits adapted from Tidal.

Notes
  signifies a co-producer
 "Lamborghini Truck (Atlanta Shit)" features additional vocals from Sitara Kanhai

Sample credits
 "Proud" contains an interpolation from "My Momma", performed by Future featuring Wiz Khalifa.

Personnel
Credits adapted from Tidal.

Performers
 2 Chainz – rapping
 YG – rapping 
 Offset – rapping 

Technical
 Nolan Presley – record engineering 
 Finis "KY" White – mixing 
 Glenn Schick - mastering 

Production
 June James – production 
 The Hit Cartel – production 
 T-Minus – production 
 J. Valle – co-production 
 Nonstop – production 
 Cassius Jay – additional production 
 Streetrunner – production 
 Tarik Azzouz – production

Charts

References

2018 EPs
2 Chainz albums
Albums produced by T-Minus (record producer)
Def Jam Recordings EPs